Local elections in parts of the United Kingdom were held on Thursday 2 May 2019, with 248 English local councils, six directly elected mayors in England, and all 11 local councils in Northern Ireland being contested.

A total of 8,886 councillors were elected: terms were up for 8,861 seats, but eight elections for a total of 14 seats were postponed due to the death of a candidate; there were also casual vacancies to be filled: 38 in England (including on nine councils with no other elections) and one on Dundee City Council in Scotland.

With the exception of areas whose electoral cycle has temporarily changed (due to a boundary review) or permanently changed, or that have been reorganised, the seats up for election in England were last contested in the 2015 local elections, on the same day as the general election of that year. The seats in Northern Ireland were last regularly contested in 2014.

The biggest winners were the Liberal Democrats, who gained 704 seats to make a total of 1,351 councillors. The biggest losers were the Conservative Party down 1,333 from their previous total to 3,561 seats. Labour also lost seats, down by 84 to 2,021 seats. The Green Party gained 194 seats for a total of 265 seats. UKIP lost 145 seats, having only 31 councillors elected.

Voters
All registered electors (British, Irish, Commonwealth and European Union citizens) who were aged 18 or over on the day of the election were entitled to vote in the local elections.

A person with two homes (such as a university student having a term-time address and living at home during holidays) could register to vote at both addresses as long as the addresses are not in the same electoral area, and can vote in the local elections for the two different local councils.

Ten local authorities in England required voters to provide identification as part of trial schemes.

Background
A majority of the councils up for election in this year were last elected in 2015, the same day as the general election. The result of the 2018 local elections saw the collapse of the United Kingdom Independence Party's vote, largely to the benefit of the Conservatives. The Liberal Democrats made gains in 2018; David Cutts, a professor of political science at the University of Birmingham, argued that the 2019 elections would be more a test of their relevance as the elections were in old strongholds of theirs.

In the run-up to the elections, Facebook announced that they would only allow political adverts from authenticated accounts. The government also funded a grant scheme for disabled candidates to participate, funding 60 candidates.

Brexit dominated UK politics leading up to the local elections. In March, there was a demonstration in London, the Put it to the People March, in favour of a second referendum on EU membership, with an attendance reported to be between several hundred thousand and over one million. In addition, an online petition calling for revocation of the UK's withdrawal notification under Article 50 TEU reached over 6 million signatures, becoming the fastest signed petition ever in the UK. On 29 March thousands of pro-Brexit marchers demonstrated in Parliament Square in London. Though the UK was set to leave the European Union on 29 March, this was initially delayed till 12 April, then was further delayed to 31 October. Because of this longer extension, the UK participated within elections to the European Parliament in order to avoid a no-deal scenario on 1 June.

In April, protests in London around Parliament Square and Westminster organised by the environmental pressure group Extinction Rebellion took place, in which activist blocked roads, bridges and glued themselves to public buildings. A total of 1,130 people were arrested during the demonstrations.

Vince Cable, leader of the Liberal Democrats, announced on 14 March that he would be stepping down from that role, with a new leadership election to be held after the May local elections. There has been pressure within the Conservative party on prime minister Theresa May to resign following the local elections, triggering a new leadership election.

Campaigning 
The Conservatives stood candidates in 96% of the available seats, Labour contested 77%, the Liberal Democrats 53%, the Green Party of England and Wales 30% and UKIP 16%.

According to the Electoral Reform Society, there are 148 councillors who were elected unopposed, largely Conservatives. New parties the Brexit Party and Change UK, although both standing in European elections later in the month, did not stand in the local elections. Chuka Umunna, Change UK's spokesperson, recommended voters support anti-Brexit parties like the Liberal Democrats or Greens. Leave.EU encouraged people to spoil their ballot paper in protest at delays in Brexit.

Nationally, Labour organised their campaign on raising awareness of the impact of the austerity programme by the Conservative-led government on local councils, which has led subsequently to higher council tax and reduced local services. As an effect of cuts to council budgets, council spending per person has fallen 30% since 2010. The shadow chancellor, John McDonnell, had commented that the economic policies of Preston City Council, where Labour took control of the council in 2011, were a model that he wanted other Labour councils to follow. Their changes have seen the public procurement budget rise significantly, unemployment decrease and quality of life improve. Labour has sought to avoid talking about Brexit, but internal rows over their Brexit policy have created headlines.

Similarly, the Conservatives focused their campaign away from Brexit and instead on efficient local services, low council tax and green credentials. This detraction from Brexit, however, has been quite difficult. Internal party sources has voiced a negative outlook to the success of these elections, with the deputy chair of the party saying it was an opportunity for voters to protest against the party's handling of the Brexit negotiations. ConservativeHome interviewed ten Conservative councillors about how the campaigning had gone across the country and found a negative attitude. Defence secretary Gavin Williamson was sacked the day before the elections, which was predicted to be unhelpful for the Conservative campaign.

There were isolated incidents of politically-motivated violence during the election campaign. There have been a few cases of councillors, from the Labour and Conservative parties, being assaulted whilst campaigning. A currently unknown assailant fired shots at the home of a Labour councillor in Sheffield. Homes with Labour, Liberal Democrat and Green signs were damaged in Lewes, and a Liberal Democrat candidate's car was attacked and painted with swastikas in Faversham.

Results

England
 
† Final results

The Conservatives lost control of 44 councils and more than 1,300 council seats. It was the worst Conservative local election performance since 1995, when the party lost more than 2,000 seats. Labour, despite topping national polls, lost 6 councils and more than 80 seats.

Parties supporting remaining in the EU performed well. The Liberal Democrats made the most gains of any party, while the Greens also picked up seats with the largest percentage growth. This election was the largest rise in Green council seat gains in 20 years. There was also a significant increase in the number of independent and local party councillors, with their number of seats more than doubling. Similarly, in Northern Ireland, Alliance (the Lib Dems' sister party), some smaller parties and independents also made significant gains.

The elections were marked by a number of spoiled ballots expressing anger toward the Brexit stances of the Conservative and Labour parties. In the voter ID trial areas an average of 102 voters in each pilot area failed to vote due to not having the required documentation, compared with 70 per pilot area in 2018.

Analysis
Leading up to the election journalist had noted the high turnout of the 2015 local election, when the 2015 general election took place, benefited the Conservatives greatly. Various sources have predicted a loss of seats for the Conservatives between 500 and 1000; with Conservative peer Lord Robert Hayward projected that them losing at least 800 seats, predicting 500 to go to the Liberal Democrats and 300 to Labour. Because the group of local councils varies with each cycle of local elections, the BBC and other analysts calculated a projected national vote share, which aims to assess what the council results indicate the UK-wide vote would be if the results were repeated at a general election. The BBC's estimate put Labour and the Conservatives on 28% (both down 7% from last year), the Liberal Democrats on 18% (up 2% from last year) and all other parties as 'other' on 25%. Some have argued that the Conservatives put their expectations so low so that the impact of losses were reduced. Media reports described the results as poor for both Labour and the Conservatives, with many noting decline of Labour representation in some leave areas. It was also regarded as a disappointing result for the Labour because of expectations that they would gain.

Will Jennings, a professor at the University of Southampton analysed ward-level data and found little correlation to support Labour's decline in areas that voted 'leave'. With the Labour making gains and loses in areas that both voted to leave and remain in the 2016 referendum. Jennings instead noted the results better fit the transition in British politics; where large cities, areas with high student population and professionals moving towards Labour, whilst deindustrialised towns are moving towards the Conservatives. Sir John Curtice, who calculated the BBC's national projected vote share, commented that the rise of smaller parties and in particular the independents showed a dissatisfaction with the party system presently. Additionally, Curtice noted how the Green party benefited from recent climate protests across the country. Simon Briscoe, statistician and director of The Data Analysis Bureau, was critical of the idea that the Liberal Democrats had surge on the scale that commentators describes, he instead attributed this towards much lower turnout from the 2015 election. An example of this is that swings towards the Liberal Democrats masks that the numbers voting for them hadn't changed significantly from 2015. Martin Baxter, the creator of the political analytics website Electoral Calculus, suggested that the election data indicated that the next general election could produce a Labour-Scottish Nationalist coalition government.

England
In England, council elections were held in 33 metropolitan boroughs, 168 of the second-tier districts, and 47 of the unitary authorities, as well as for six directly elected mayoral posts. 248 of the 343 English local councils held elections, with the exception of eight unitary authorities, the Isles of Scilly, the 26 counties, 24 non-metropolitan districts and boroughs, three metropolitan boroughs, the 32 London boroughs and the City of London. 8,399 seats were up for election (but elections are postponed for 14), with a further 38 casual vacancies to be filled, so 8,423 councillors were elected. Elections also took place for most English parish councils.

By-elections were held for seven county council seats (in Cambridgeshire, Cumbria, Gloucestershire, Kent (two seats), Surrey and West Sussex) and for two seats in the London Borough of Lewisham. Other casual vacancies to be filled (variously by by-election or multiple vacancy election) are indicated in the tables below by a superscript addition (+n).

Metropolitan boroughs
In 33 of the 36 English metropolitan borough councils, one-third of their seats were up for election. Elections were not held in Birmingham, Doncaster or Rotherham.

Unitary authorities
Elections took place in 47 of the 55 unitary authorities. No elections took place in Bristol, Cornwall, the Isle of Wight, Shropshire, Warrington or Wiltshire.

By-elections took place in Durham (2 seats) and Northumberland, in addition to those indicated below.

Whole council
In 30 English unitary authorities the whole council was up for election.

Unitary authorities for Bournemouth and Poole had merged with Christchurch district council to form one new unitary for the eastern portion of Dorset. An additional unitary authority replaced the remaining portion of Dorset County Council’s area and the district councils of North, West and East Dorset, Weymouth and Portland and Purbeck. Both authorities had their inaugural elections in May, and their predecessor authorities were all Conservative controlled except for Weymouth and Portland, which is in no overall control. Nine other unitary authorities were elected on new ward boundaries.

* New council (2)‡ New ward boundaries following an authority area boundary review (9)

Third of council
In 17 English unitary authorities one third of the council is up for election.

Non-metropolitan districts
Elections took place in 168 non-metropolitan districts.

The new districts of Somerset West and Taunton, East Suffolk and West Suffolk held their first elections in 2019. They replace Taunton Deane, West Somerset, Waveney, Suffolk Coastal, Forest Heath, and St Edmundsbury.

Aylesbury Vale, Chiltern, Corby, Daventry, East Northamptonshire, Kettering, Northampton, South Bucks, South Northamptonshire, Wellingborough and Wycombe originally had elections scheduled for 2019, but the elections were postponed in law following a decision to merge these councils into unitary authorities covering Northamptonshire and Buckinghamshire.

Additionally, there were no elections in Adur, Cheltenham, Fareham, Gloucester, Gosport, Harrogate, Hastings, Huntingdonshire, Nuneaton and Bedworth, Oxford, South Cambridgeshire or Stroud.

A by-election was held in Newcastle-under-Lyme, in addition to those indicated below.

Whole council
In 121 English district authorities the whole council was up for election.

46 of these councils were electing on new ward boundaries, including six councils which normally elect by thirds: Carlisle, Crawley, Norwich, Preston, Reigate and Banstead and Runnymede. In addition, Great Yarmouth and Wyre Forest switched from thirds to whole council elections.

* New council (3)† Minor ward boundary changes due to parish boundary changes (4)‡ New ward boundaries following a district boundary review (42)! Returns to electing by thirds next year (6)• Previously elected by thirds (2)

Third of council
In 47 English district authorities, one-third of the council is up for election.

Seven other district councils normally elect by thirds. As noted above, due to boundary changes, six of these have all-up elections. Daventry originally had elections scheduled for 2019, but the elections were postponed following a decision to merge the seven districts of Northamptonshire into two unitary authorities covering the county from 2020.

Mayoral elections
Six direct mayoral elections were held. Five are for local authorities (the Mayoralty of Torbay is abolished this year):

One election was held for a regional mayor: this newly established combined authority was set up by groups of local councils, much like similar devolution deals across the country, giving the combined authorities additional powers and funding.

Northern Ireland

In Northern Ireland, local elections were last held in 2014. No party held a working majority on any council (proportional representation makes this less likely) before the 2019 election, although the Democratic Unionist Party came close on Lisburn and Castlereagh City Council, with half of the seats.

The Electoral Office for Northern Ireland published lists and total numbers of candidates , showing that a total of 819 persons were nominated to stand. Elections are by single transferable vote in 5- to 7-member district electoral areas.

Scotland
The council by-election in Scotland (seat previously Labour) was won by the Scottish National Party, resulting in the party taking control of Dundee City Council.

References
Footnotes

Citations

External links
 Trailer - Local Elections May 2019  
Local Elections Handbook 2019

Local election news articles at the BBC

 
local elections
2019
local elections